is a railway station on the Konan Railway Konan Line in Inakadate, Aomori, Japan, operated by the private railway operator Konan Railway.

Lines

Station layout
The station has one side platform serving a single bi-directional track. The station is open only between April and November.

Adjacent stations

History

Originally scheduled to open on 1 August 2013, Tamboāto Station opened on 27 July 2013 at a cost of 31.2 million yen. Construction of the new station was funded entirely by the village of Inakadate.

Three former Konan Railway diesel cars, KiHa 2105, KiHa 2107, and KiHa 2230, were preserved next to the line for a number of years, painted in various bright colours, but these were due to cut up in November 2013 due to their poor condition.

Surrounding area

The station was built to provide access to the nearby rice paddies used for creating rice paddy art each year.

 Inakadate Relics Museum

See also
 List of railway stations in Japan

References

External links

 

Konan Railway
Railway stations in Aomori Prefecture
Inakadate, Aomori
Railway stations in Japan opened in 2013